Aristida purpurea is a species of grass native to North America which is known by the common name purple three-awn.

Distribution
This grass is fairly widespread and can be found across the western two thirds of the United States, much of southern Canada and parts of northern Mexico. It is most abundant on the plains.

Description
This is a perennial bunchgrass, growing erect to under a meter-3 feet in height, and the flower glumes often assumes a light brown to reddish-purple color. There are several varieties with overlapping geographical ranges. This is not considered to be a good graze for livestock because the awns are sharp and the protein content of the grass is low.

References

External links
 Calflora Database: Aristida purpurea (Purple three awn)
 Jepson Manual eFlora (TJM2) treatment of Aristida purpurea
United States Department of Agriculture, National Fores Service, Fire Effects Information System, Index of Species Information
Utah State University Herbarium, Grass Manual Treatment
UC CalPhotos gallery of Aristida purpurea (purple threeawn)

purpurea
Bunchgrasses of North America
Grasses of Canada
Grasses of Mexico
Grasses of the United States
Native grasses of the Great Plains region
Native grasses of California
Native grasses of Oklahoma
Native grasses of Texas
Flora of Northeastern Mexico
Flora of Northwestern Mexico
Flora of the Northwestern United States
Flora of the United States
Flora of the Southwestern United States
Flora of the South-Central United States
Flora of the California desert regions
Flora of the Chihuahuan Desert
Flora of the Great Basin
Flora of the Sonoran Deserts
Natural history of the California chaparral and woodlands
Natural history of the Colorado Desert
Flora of the Mexican Plateau
Natural history of the Mojave Desert
Natural history of the Peninsular Ranges
Plants described in 1835
Garden plants of North America
Drought-tolerant plants